Laverne Hanover (foaled 1966 in Pennsylvania) was a brown Standardbred horse whose wins included the 1969 Little Brown Jug, the most important race for three-year-old pacers, and the 1970 American Pacing Classic at Hollywood Park Racetrack.

Laverne Hanover was retired to stud at the end of the 1971 race season having won 61 of his 98 career starts. He had limited success as a sire.

References

1966 racehorse births
Racehorses bred in Pennsylvania
American Standardbred racehorses
Little Brown Jug winners
United States Harness Racing Hall of Fame inductees
Harness racing in the United States